This is a list of football matches and competitions currently involving the Serbia national football team. For results of more specific decades see the lists below.

Friendlies

UEFA Euro 2008 qualifying

Results

Goalscorers during the qualification
7 goals

Nikola Žigić

4 goals

Danko Lazović

3 goals

Boško Janković

2 goals

Zdravko Kuzmanović

1 goal

Branislav Ivanović
Dejan Stanković
Duško Tošić
Milan Jovanović
Milan Smiljanić
Sergei Ostapenko (Own Goal)

Attendance

2010 FIFA World Cup qualification

Results

Goalscorers during the qualification
5 goals

Milan Jovanović

3 goals

Branislav Ivanović
Nikola Žigić

2 goals

Miloš Krasić
Nenad Milijaš

1 goal

Marko Pantelić
Zdravko Kuzmanović
Ivan Obradović
Neven Subotić
Zoran Tošić
Jón Rói Jacobsen (Own Goal)
Dorel Stoica (Own Goal)

Attendance

2010 FIFA World Cup

Results

Goalscorers

1 goal

 Milan Jovanović
 Marko Pantelić

UEFA Euro 2012 qualifying

Results

Goalscorers during the qualification

3 goals

 Marko Pantelić
 Nikola Žigić

2 goals

 Zoran Tošić

1 goal

 Branislav Ivanović
 Milan Jovanović
 Zdravko Kuzmanović
 Danko Lazović
 Dejan Stanković

Attendance

2014 FIFA World Cup qualification

Results

Goalscorers during the qualification
4 goals

Aleksandar Kolarov

3 goals

Filip Đuričić

2 goals

Dušan Tadić

1 goal

Branislav Ivanović
Zoran Tošić
Lazar Marković
Miralem Sulejmani
Dušan Basta
Stefan Šćepović
Aleksandar Mitrović
Filip Đorđević
Stefan Ristovski (Own goal)

Attendance

UEFA Euro 2016 qualifying

Results

Goalscorers during the qualification
3 goals

Zoran Tošić

2 goals

Adem Ljajić

1 goal

Nemanja Matić
Aleksandar Kolarov
Levon Hayrapetyan (Own Goal)

Attendance

2018 FIFA World Cup qualification

Results

Goalscorers during the qualification
6 goals

Aleksandar Mitrović

4 goals

Dušan Tadić

2 goals

Aleksandar Kolarov
Filip Kostić
Mijat Gaćinović

1 goal

Branislav Ivanović
Nemanja Matić
Luka Milivojević
Aleksandar Prijović

Attendance

2018 FIFA World Cup

Results

Goalscorers

1 goal

 Aleksandar Kolarov
 Aleksandar Mitrović

2018–19 UEFA Nations League

Results

Goalscorers during the competition
6 goals

Aleksandar Mitrović

2 goals

Adem Ljajić

1 goals

Dušan Tadić
Aleksandar Prijović
Artūras Žulpa (Own Goal)

Attendance

UEFA Euro 2020 qualifying

Results

Play-off

Semi-final

Final

Goalscorers during the qualification
10 goals

Aleksandar Mitrović

2 goals

Nemanja Radonjić
Dušan Tadić
Luka Jović
Sergej Milinković-Savić

1 goal

Adem Ljajić
Nikola Milenković

2020–21 UEFA Nations League

Results

Goalscorers during the competition
2 goals

Luka Jović
Aleksandar Mitrović
Nemanja Radonjić

1 goal

Sergej Milinković-Savić
Filip Mladenović
Dušan Vlahović

2022 FIFA World Cup qualification

Results

Goalscorers during the competition
8 goals

Aleksandar Mitrović

4 goals

Dušan Vlahović

2 goals

Dušan Tadić

1 goal

Filip Kostić
Nikola Milenković
Sergej Milinković-Savić

2022–23 UEFA Nations League

Results

Goalscorers during the competition
6 goals

Aleksandar Mitrović

2 goals

Luka Jović

1 goal

Sergej Milinković-Savić
Andrija Živković
Nemanja Radonjić
Saša Lukić
Dušan Vlahović

2022 FIFA World Cup

Results

Goalscorers during the competition
2 goals

Aleksandar Mitrović

1 goal

Sergej Milinković-Savić
Dušan Vlahović
Strahinja Pavlović

UEFA Euro 2024 qualifying

Results

Goalscorers during the qualification

All matches summary

FIFA World Cup

Total score in FIFA World Cup matches

Goal scorers
These players scored goals in FIFA World Cup matches:

2 goal
 Aleksandar Mitrović
1 goal

 Milan Jovanović
 Aleksandar Kolarov
 Marko Pantelić
 Sergej Milinković-Savić
 Strahinja Pavlović

Major competitions qualifying matches

Total score in FIFA and UEFA competitions qualifying matches.

Goal scorers
These players scored goals in qualifying matches:

25 goals

 Aleksandar Mitrović

13 goals

 Nikola Žigić

10 goals

 Dušan Tadić

7 goals

 Milan Jovanović
 Zoran Tošić
 Branislav Ivanović
 Aleksandar Kolarov

5 goals

 Danko Lazović

4 goals

 Zdravko Kuzmanović
 Marko Pantelić
 Dušan Vlahović

3 goals

 Boško Janković
 Filip Kostić
 Sergej Milinković-Savić
 Adem Ljajić
 Filip Đuričić

2 goals

 Mijat Gaćinović
 Luka Jović
 Miloš Krasić
 Nemanja Matić
 Nikola Milenković
 Nenad Milijaš
 Nemanja Radonjić
 Dejan Stanković

1 goal

 Duško Tošić
 Miralem Sulejmani
 Stefan Šćepović
 Filip Đorđević
 Milan Smiljanić
 Neven Subotić
 Dušan Basta
 Luka Milivojević
 Ivan Obradović
 Lazar Marković
 Aleksandar Prijović
 Jón Rói Jacobsen (Own Goal)
 Stefan Ristovski (Own goal)
 Dorel Stoica (Own Goal)
 Sergei Ostapenko (Own Goal)
 Levon Hayrapetyan (Own Goal)
 Maxime Chanot (Own Goal)

UEFA Nations League

Total score in competitions matches.

Goal scorers
These players scored goals in UEFA Nations League matches:
14 goals

Aleksandar Mitrović

4 goals

Luka Jović

3 goals

Nemanja Radonjić

2 goals

Adem Ljajić
Sergej Milinković-Savić
Dušan Vlahović

1 goal

Dušan Tadić
Aleksandar Prijović
Saša Lukić
Filip Mladenović
Andrija Živković
Artūras Žulpa (Own Goal)

Friendly matches

Total score in friendly matches.

Goal scorers
These players scored goals in friendly matches:

10 goals

 Aleksandar Mitrović

8 goals

 Dušan Tadić

6 goals

 Branislav Ivanović
 Danko Lazović

5 goals

 Marko Pantelić

4 goals

 Adem Ljajić
 Luka Jović
 Zoran Tošić

3 goals

 Filip Đorđević
 Milan Jovanović
 Aleksandar Kolarov
 Dušan Vlahović
 Nikola Žigić

2 goals

 Filip Đuričić
 Boško Janković
 Zdravko Kuzmanović
 Lazar Marković
 Nenad Milijaš
 Savo Milošević
 Dragan Mrđa
 Radosav Petrović

1 goal

 Dušan Basta
 Nemanja Gudelj
 Luka Ilić
 Miloš Jojić
 Boualem Khoukhi (Own Goal)
 Miloš Krasić
 Saša Lukić
 James McCarthy (Own Goal)
 Nikola Milenković
 Sergej Milinković-Savić
 Nemanja Milunović
 Zsolt Nagy (Own Goal)
 Strahinja Pavlović
 Dejan Stanković
 Veljko Simić
 Petar Škuletić
 Neven Subotić
 Nemanja Tomić
 Aleksandar Trišović
 Veseljko Trivunović
 Nemanja Vidić

Head to head records

See also
Serbia national football team results (1945)
Serbia and Montenegro national football team results (1994–2006)
Serbia national football team results (2006–09)
Serbia national football team results (2010–19)
Serbia national football team results (2020–29)

Notes

References

External links
Results at RSSSF 

 
results